Waiter: "You Vultures!" is the debut studio album by American rock band Portugal. The Man.  It is lead singer John Gourley and bassist Zach Carothers's first album released after leaving the band Anatomy of a Ghost. Unlike the band's later recorded material, the general style of their debut full-length veers closer to a progressive post-hardcore sound, with a marked influence of The Mars Volta in particular.

Track listing

Personnel 
Portugal. The Man
John Baldwin Gourley – vocals, guitar
Wesley James Hubbard – vocals, keyboard
Zachary Scott Carothers – bass, vocals
Jason Sechrist – drums

Additional personnel
Justin Baiers – additional percussion (track 3)
Nic Newsham – additional vocals (tracks 5 and 6)
Thunderball Fist – additional vocals and keyboards (track 13)
Casey Bates – engineering
A. William Bentley – additional vocals and guitars (track 7)
Austin Sousa – additional engineering
Ed Brooks – mastering
John Gourley – illustration
Wesley Hubbard – illustration
Austin Sellers – design, photography, illustration

References

2006 debut albums
Portugal. The Man albums
Fearless Records albums